Jessie Alexandra Dick, known as J Alix Dick, (13 July 1896 – 1976) was a Scottish artist and teacher. She was known as a painter of portraits and still-life pieces in both oils and watercolours.

Biography
Dick was the youngest daughter in a family of eleven children. She was born in Largs where her father was the head gardener on the estate of Lord Kelvin. She studied at the Glasgow School of Art from 1915 to 1919 and joined the teaching staff of the School in 1921. Holding a variety of posts, but mainly teaching painting and drawing, she remained on the staff of the School until her retirement in 1959. She was an active member of the Glasgow Society of Lady Artists and, in 1960, was elected an associate member of the Royal Scottish Academy. She was also a regular exhibitor with the Royal Watercolour Society, with the Royal Society of Painter-Etchers and Engravers and at the Royal Glasgow Institute of the Fine Arts. Dick died in 1976 after a fall at the home in Clarkston she shared with one of her sisters. For many years a large portrait of her, Self Portrait in the Studio, hung in the Glasgow School of Art but was destroyed in 2014 when fire engulfed the building. After her death, several fine watercolours by Dick were saved by a neighbour when about to be thrown away. The McLean Museum and Art Gallery in Greenock holds examples of her work.

Glasgow School of Art 
From 1922 until her retirement in 1959, Alix Dick taught at the GSA in various roles:

 1922/23–1924/25: Assistant Professor (Drawing & Painting Dept) Landscape and figure composition, mural & decorative painting, portrait and costume model, painting antique and still life
 1925/26–1929/30: Lecturer (Drawing & Painting Dept) Drawing, painting, composition
 1930/31–1931/32: Drawing & Painting (School of Design) pictorial and commercial art
 1932/33: Drawing & Painting (Lower School, general course) drawing, painting, composition
 1933/34: Drawing & Painting (Lower School, general course) Still life painting, oil & watercolour
 1934/35–1937/38: Drawing & Painting, still life painting, oil & watercolour
 1938/39–1959/60: Drawing & Painting lecturer (Drawing & Painting Dept)

References

External links
 

1896 births
1976 deaths
20th-century Scottish women artists
20th-century Scottish painters
Academics of the Glasgow School of Art
Alumni of the Glasgow School of Art
Artists from Glasgow
People from Largs
Scottish women painters